Dicladanthera is a genus of flowering plants belonging to the family Acanthaceae.

Its native range is Northwestern Australia.

Species:

Dicladanthera forrestii 
Dicladanthera glabra

References

Acanthaceae
Acanthaceae genera